King James is a heavy metal supergroup formed in 1993 with guitarist Rex Carroll (Whitecross) and frontman Jimi Bennett (Sacred Fire). Some time later, they recruited Tim Gaines and Robert Sweet of Stryper, and released their first album in 1994. The band supported the album with a tour without Gaines, who declined to join after the recording. Sweet toured with the band into 1996, but did not participate in their second release. Carroll and Bennett remained together and released a second album, The Fall, in 1997.

At that time there was talk of another King James release, but Whitecross regrouped, and Jimi joined former Petra drummer Louie Weaver to form Viktor. Both groups have released new CDs as of 2006.  After fulfilling those obligations, the band regrouped and released MaXimus in June 2013.

Members
 Rex Carroll – guitar
 Jimi Bennett – vocals
 Benny Ramos – bass guitar
 Michael Feighan – drums

Former members
 Tim Gaines – bass guitar
 Robert Sweet – drums
 Ean Evans - bass guitar

Discography
1993: Three-song demo
1994: King James (Star Song / EMI)
1997: The Fall (Viva Europe)
2013: MaXimus (Madison Line Records)

References

External links
 

American heavy metal musical groups
Musical groups established in 1993
Musical quartets
1993 establishments in the United States
Heavy metal supergroups